Microfilter may refer to:

 DSL filter, used to prevent interference between analog devices and a DSL service on a telephone line
 A type of filter used in the microfiltration process